David Hogg Ness (15 August 1902 – 1974) was a Scottish footballer who played as an outside right; his only club at the professional level was Partick Thistle, where he spent twelve seasons (all in the top division), making 423 appearances for the Jags in all competitions and scoring 97 goals.

After gradually ousting the 1921 Scottish Cup Final goalscorer John Blair from the position, he went on to play for the club in the 1930 Scottish Cup Final which they lost to Rangers after a replay, but did manage to claim winner's medals in the Glasgow Merchants Charity Cup in 1927 and the one-off Glasgow Dental Hospital Cup in 1928, both against the same opponents. Towards the end of his spell, a replacement was signed in the shape of Alex McSpadyen, who went on to become a Scotland international within a few years.

Ness was selected once for the Scottish Football League XI, scoring in that match against the Irish League XI in 1934, and played in three editions of the Glasgow Football Association's annual challenge match against Sheffield.

References

1902 births
1974 deaths
Date of death missing
Footballers from Irvine, North Ayrshire
Scottish footballers
Association football outside forwards
Scottish Junior Football Association players
Irvine Meadow XI F.C. players
Partick Thistle F.C. players
Nithsdale Wanderers F.C. players
Scottish Football League players
Scotland junior international footballers
Scottish Football League representative players